Bedfordshire on Sunday (BoS) was a free local newspaper published in Bedfordshire, England. It was distributed as two editions, one covering the Borough of Bedford, the other edition serves Central Bedfordshire. The gross distribution was around 112,000.

Distribution 
The newspaper was distributed using either through delivery through letterboxes on a Sunday morning, or more recently given out at local supermarkets, newsagents and other local points of interest.

The paper was published by LSN Media Ltd which was previously owned by Frank Branston. Branston, who founded the newspaper in 1977,  went on to become the first directly elected mayor of the borough of Bedford in 2002. Branston sold his share of LSN to Iliffe News and Media in 2005. 

In 2012, Local World acquired Iliffe News & Media from Yattendon Group, and in turn this was acquired by Trinity Mirror. The newspaper's last edition was on 1 October 2017, (one of 40 local newspapers to close that year) and was replaced by a midweek newspaper with less emphasis on news and more on leisure activities called Bedfordshire Midweek, however this was closed after eight months of publication.

Style
The style of journalism was generally more sensationalist than a typical local paper, and time and again its front page stories have been picked up by the national press over the years. Most notable was a story about dead bodies being stored in a chapel at Bedford Hospital rather than a morgue in 2001. A story about a teenager being banned for life from the United States after insulting Barack Obama received worldwide attention in 2010.

Online media
Bedfordshire on Sunday published most of its news online for free, however Trinity Mirror shut the sites down shortly after the closure of the print edition.

References

Newspapers published in Bedfordshire
Bedford
Newspapers established in 1977
1977 establishments in England
Defunct Sunday newspapers published in the United Kingdom
Publications disestablished in 2017